Errington  may refer to:

Errington, British Columbia, a small community on Vancouver Island, British Columbia, Canada
Errington Elementary School, a public elementary school in Errington, British Columbia, Canada
John T. Errington Elementary School, a public elementary school in Richmond, British Columbia, Canada
Errington (surname), list of people with this name
The Errington baronets, three Baronetcies of England and the United Kingdom
Errington v Wood, a 1951 English contract law case concerning agreement